Armand Niccolai (November 8, 1911 – December 2, 1988) was a guard who played nine seasons in the National Football League. Niccolai attended Duquesne University.

Armand Niccolai played nine seasons for the Pittsburgh Pirates/Steelers after attending nearby Duquesne University. He led the team in scoring in four years, including posting a personal-best 28 points in both 1935 and 1936. He booted a Steelers'-best seven field goals in 1936, which that mark would not be broken for the next 14 years.

Niccolai died in Monessen, Pennsylvania.

External links

1911 births
1988 deaths
Players of American football from Pennsylvania
American football offensive linemen
American football placekickers
Pittsburgh Pirates (football) players
Pittsburgh Steelers players
Duquesne University alumni
Burials at Monongahela Cemetery